Cooke's Building is a Grade II listed building located at 104 Abbey Road in Barrow-in-Furness, Cumbria, England. Designed by Howard Evans for businessman Henry Whiteside, Cooke's Building was built in 1875 and contains five-storey building (including a basement and attic). It served as a furniture store for the majority of its history up until 1959 when its owners; 'H Cooke and Sons' entered liquidation. During the 1980s and 1990s, Cooke's Building's basement level was home to the Sub Zero nightclub, however lay vacant during the 2000s. In 2012, a £2 million renovation was completed on behalf of Barrow Borough Council and Signal Films, who are now primary tenants of Cooke's Building using it as studios and offices. The building is bound by two other Grade II listed buildings – The Duke of Edinburgh Hotel and Oxford Chambers, the latter of which was formerly jointly listed with Cooke's Building.

References

External links
 2008 Archaeological Survey of Cooke's Building

Commercial buildings completed in 1875
Buildings and structures in Barrow-in-Furness
Grade II listed buildings in Cumbria
Grade II listed commercial buildings